Periodicity or periodic may refer to:

Mathematics 
 Bott periodicity theorem, addresses Bott periodicity: a modulo-8 recurrence relation in the homotopy groups of classical groups
 Periodic function, a function whose output contains values that repeat periodically
 Periodic mapping

Physical sciences 
 Periodic table of chemical elements
 Periodic trends, relative characteristics of chemical elements observed
 Redshift periodicity, astronomical term for redshift quantization

Other uses 
 Fokker periodicity blocks, which mathematically relate musical intervals
 Periodic acid, a compound of iodine
 Principle of periodicity, a concept in generally accepted accounting principles
 Quasiperiodicity, property of a system that displays irregular periodicity

See also
 Aperiodic (disambiguation)
 Cycle (disambiguation)
 Frequency (disambiguation)
 Period (disambiguation)
 Periodical
 Seasonality, periodic variation, or periodic fluctuations